was a road cyclist from Japan. She finished second in the Japanese National Road Race Championships in 2008, and represented her nation at the 2008 UCI Road World Championships. She was diagnosed with acute myeloid leukemia in February 2009 and died of the disease on 2 July 2010.

References

External links
 profile at Cyclingarchives.com

1982 births
Japanese female cyclists
2010 deaths
People from Minoh, Osaka
Deaths from leukemia